Cadrezzate con Osmate is a comune (municipality) in the province of Varese, Lombardy, northern Italy. It was formed in 2019 by the merger of the previous comuni of Cadrezzate and Osmate.

References

Cities and towns in Lombardy